Hermann Seldeneck (13 September 1864 - April 1922) was a German actor. He appeared in more than fifty films from 1911 to 1920.

Selected filmography

References

External links 

1864 births
1922 deaths
German male film actors
German male silent film actors
20th-century German male actors
Male actors from Munich